Lotus Racing may refer to: 

 The umbrella name for Lotus Cars parent company Group Lotus plc's racing division, formerly Lotus Motorsport
 The name under which Team Lotus (2010–2011) competed in the 2010 Formula One season

See also 
 Team Lotus, motorsport team in the period 1954–1994
 Pacific Team Lotus, participant in the 1994 and 1995 Formula One seasons
 Lotus Renault GP, participant in the 2011 Formula One season
 Lotus F1, participant in Formula One from 2012 until 2015